The 2015 Zimbabwe Premier Soccer League is the 36th season of top-tier football in Zimbabwe. The season began on 21 March 2015 and concluded on 28 November 2015 with Chicken Inn F.C. winning their first league title , snapping a run of four straight titles by Dynamos F.C.

Dongo Sawmills, Flame Lilly and Whawha - all newcomers to the league - were relegated to the 2016 Zimbabwe Division 1, along with Buffaloes F.C. as they each finished in the bottom four positions in the league table.

Attendances

Highlanders F.C. drew the highest average home attendance: 7,276.

Teams
A total of 16 teams contested the league, including 12 sides from the 2014 season and four promoted from the 2014 Zimbabwe Division 1, Dongo Sawmills FC, Flame Lilly FC, Tsholotsho FC and Wha Wha FC.
On the other hand, Black Rhinos F.C., Shabanie Mine F.C., Bantu Rovers F.C. and Chiredzi FC were the last three teams of the 2014 season and will play in the Zimbabwe Division 1 for the 2015 season. Dynamos F.C. are the defending champions from the 2014 season.

Stadiums and locations

League table

Results
All teams play in a double round robin system (home and away).

Positions by round

Season statistics

Scoring

Top scorers

Hat-tricks

4 Player scored 4 goals.

Scoring
First goal of the season: Simba Gorogodyo for Tsholotsho against Harare City (20 March 2015)

Promoted:
Ngezi Platinum (Selous)             (winners Northern Region Division One)
Bulawayo City                       (winners Southern Region Division One)
Border Strikers (Beitbridge)        (winners Central Region Division One)
Mutare City                         (winners Eastern Region Division One)

References

2015 in African association football leagues
Zimbabwe Premier Soccer League